= Grotons, Virginia =

Unincorporated community in Virginia, United States

Coordinates: 37°55′34″N 75°38′37″W

Grotons is an unincorporated community in Accomack County, Virginia, United States.
